Bucculatrix longispiralis is a moth in the family Bucculatricidae. It was described in 2001 by Svetlana Vladimirovna Baryshnikova. It is found in Nepal.

References

Natural History Museum Lepidoptera generic names catalog

Bucculatricidae
Moths described in 2001
Moths of Asia